"The Sovrans of the Old World" (Romanesco original title: Li soprani der monno vecchio) is an 1831 sonnet written in the dialect of Rome, by poet Giuseppe Gioachino Belli. It is part of the collection Sonetti romaneschi, sometimes listed as number 361 or 362.

The sonnet is primarily a satire of 1800s Italian civilization. However, in analyzing the raw, crude politics of his own time Belli touched upon a much broader section of Italy’s history, and upon the losses the nation suffered from foreign invasions and local abuses of power. 

The parable quoted above describes the latter phenomenon. A king confiscates all of his vassals’ possessions; when the people ask why, the king replies that he can treat them as he likes because he matters and they do not. Although phrased in vulgar terms, this remark encompasses a living reality. Thus Belli from this brief anecdote part to analyze the particular condition of the populace and mediocre Italian which, because of its same condition of choice, is always found to suffer and to keep the head bent in front of who is more powerful. As it says in the sonnet the author, who is not a Pope, King or Emperor in our society, and that counts for nothing less than the earth we walk. And so, returning to speak feudal monarch, warns the people who dared to question his statutes and cruelty that was out of the mouth, it would have been put to death, because perhaps the Executioner was the only honest work to do, if you had not powerful, says the king. And the people, stupid, inferior, stupid and gullible, cheering applauding the king's words.

Among the translators of the sonnet, Peter Nicholas Dale, which translated it into Strine, the Australian English dialect of the 1960s, in which title is rendered as The Lieders a  the Old World.

The verse Io sò io, e vvoi nun zete un cazzo (literally "I am who I am, and you are fuck nobodies") was famously appropriated by Mario Monicelli in his 1981 movie Il Marchese del Grillo, in which it is rendered in modern Romanesco dialect as "io sò io e voi nun siete un cazzo," and has since then become a frequent quote of contemporary Italian culture.

Notes

References
Berselli, Edmondo (2000) Senza più regole in l'Espresso, March 11, 2010
Coarelli, Filippo and Giuseppe Gioachino Belli (2000) Belli e l'antico: con 50 sonetti di G. G. Belli 
Norse, Harold (1956) Translations from G. G. Belli in The Hudson Review Vol. 9, No. 1 (Spring, 1956), pp. 71–85 
Mario Monicelli (2009), Interview to Mario Monicelli in Corriere magazine, September 2, 2009,

Further reading
Norse, Harold (1960) The Roman Sonnets of Giuseppe Gioachino Belli. Preface by William Carlos Williams. Introduction by Alberto Moravia

Italian poems
Sonnets
19th century in Rome
Rome in fiction
1831 poems